The GBU-8 Homing Bomb System (HOBOS) is a 2000 lb [CONVERT] electro-optical guided bomb developed for the United States Air Force.

Description

The GBU-8 consists of a contrast seeker in the nose section, four cruciform tailfins with flying surfaces for control, strakes connecting the tailfins with the nose section, and a 2000 lb  Mk. 84 LDGP bomb. The same type of guidance kit was also attached to a 3000 lb Mark 118 bomb, where it was designated GBU-9.

History

Development of the Homing Bomb System (HOBOS) by Rockwell began in 1967 on the request of the U.S. Air Force in response to shortcomings of the AGM-62 Walleye during the Vietnam War. The payload of the 2000 lb Mk. 84 bomb was considered to be more effective than the smaller explosive warhead found on the Walleye, which was designed by the Navy for anti-ship use.

The system was deployed to Ubon, Thailand in January 1969 and was subsequently used in combat for the first time in February 1969. 

The HOBOS system was also used in Operation Linebacker with the 8th TFW once bombing resumed April 1972. On 27 April 1972, the HOBOS guided bomb was used against the Thanh Hóa Bridge, with five bombs expended. In the strike against the Paul Doumer Bridge on 10 May 1972, seven HOBOS bombs and twenty-two laser-guided bombs were used.

Development of the basic HOBOS concept continued after the Vietnam War with the GBU-15, which built off of the basic concepts introduced with the GBU-8.

Variants
 KMU-353A/B: Contrast-seeker guidance kit for 2000 lb Mk. 84 bomb
 KMU-359/B: Infrared guidance section
 KMU-390/B: Contrast-seeker guidance kit for 3000 lb M118 bomb

See also
 GBU-15
 AGM-62 Walleye

References 

Guided bombs of the United States
Cold War aerial bombs of the United States
Military equipment introduced in the 1970s